Faye Lo Po'  (born 1 February 1936) is a former Australian politician, serving as member of the New South Wales Legislative Assembly for the electorate of Penrith between 1991 and 2003.

Political career
A longtime member of the Labor Party, Lo Po' was heavily involved in local politics in the 1970s and 1980s, culminating in a term as mayor of the Penrith City Council in 1990–1991, before being elected to the NSW Parliament. While an MP, she held a number of portfolios, including Minister for Women, Community Services, Fair Trading, Consumer Affairs. While the ALP were in opposition from 1994 to 1995, she was Shadow Minister for Housing.

She was Alderman of Prospect Electricity from 1980 to 1987 and from 1991 to 1992, serving as chair. From 1986 to 1987, she was chair of the NSW Women's Advisory Council, a Member of the Metropolitan Waste Disposal Authority, chair of the NSW Board of Adult Education, and patron of various groups. She was appointed a Member of the Order of Australia (AM) in 1984.

References

|-

|-

|-

|-

Living people
Members of the New South Wales Legislative Assembly
Members of the Order of Australia
1936 births
Australian Labor Party members of the Parliament of New South Wales
21st-century Australian politicians
21st-century Australian women politicians
Women members of the New South Wales Legislative Assembly
Mayors of Penrith, New South Wales
Women mayors of places in New South Wales